The 2022 Texas State Bobcats softball team represented Texas State University during the 2020 NCAA Division I softball season. The Bobcats played their home games at Bobcat Softball Stadium. The Bobcats were led by twenty-second year head coach Ricci Woodard and were members of the Sun Belt Conference.

Preseason

Sun Belt Conference Coaches Poll
The Sun Belt Conference Coaches Poll was released on January 31, 2022. Texas State was picked to finish second in the conference with 87 votes and 2 first place votes.

Preseason All-Sun Belt team

Preseason Player of the Year
Sara Vanderford (TXST, 3rd Base)

Team
Olivia Lackie (USA, Pitcher)
Leanna Johnson (TROY, Pitcher)
Kandra Lamb (LA, Pitcher)
Jessica Mullins (TXST, Pitcher)
Kamdyn Kvistad (USA, Catcher)
Sophie Piskos (LA, Catcher)
Faith Shirley (GASO, 1st Base)
Kelly Horne (TROY, 2nd Base)
Daisy Hess (GSU, Shortstop)
Sara Vanderford (TXST, 3rd Base)
Iyanla De Jesus (CCU, Designated Player)
Raina O'Neal (LA, Outfielder)
Mackenzie Brasher (USA, Outfielder)
Emily Brown (GSU, Outfielder)
Jade Sinness (TROY, Outfielder)

National Softball Signing Day

Personnel

Schedule and results

Schedule Source:
*Rankings are based on the team's current ranking in the NFCA/USA Softball poll.

References

Texas State
Texas State Bobcats softball seasons
Texas State Bobcats softball